Sir Reginald Fleming Johnston,  ("Sir Johnston"; 13 October 1874 – 6 March 1938) was a British diplomat who served as the tutor and advisor to Puyi, the last emperor of China. He was also the last British Commissioner of Weihaiwei. Johnston's book Twilight in the Forbidden City (1934) was used as a source for Bernardo Bertolucci's film dramatization of Puyi's life The Last Emperor.

Early life
Johnston was born in Edinburgh, Scotland. He studied at the University of Edinburgh and later was awarded a scholarship to read modern history at Magdalen College, Oxford University.

In 1898, he joined the Colonial Service and was initially posted to Hong Kong. In 1906, he was transferred to the British leased territory at Weihaiwei on the coast of the Shandong Peninsula as a District Officer, working with Sir James Stewart Lockhart. For his extreme industry, Johnston was noted from his superiors as a capable colonial magistrate. Johnston was also a keen traveller. In 1902, he explored Tonkin, Laos and Siam. In 1904, he visited Kiautschou, Jinan, and later Korea. In January 1906, he undertook a year-long journey from Peking to Mandalay, publishing an account of his experiences in 1908.

A "militant anti-Christian" whose criticism of missionaries in China possibly hindered his promotion, Johnston was fascinated by Chinese Buddhism. In 1908, he had a private audience with the 13th Dalai Lama, one of the few westerners to do so. He wrote three books during his time in the service: From Peking to Mandalay (1908), Lion and Dragon in Northern China (1910), and Buddhist China (1913).

Tutor to Puyi, in the Forbidden City
In 1919, he was appointed tutor of thirteen-year-old Puyi who still lived inside the Forbidden City in Peking as a non-sovereign monarch.

As the Scottish-born tutor to the Dragon Emperor, Johnston and Isabel Ingram, daughter of an American missionary and the empress's tutor, were the only foreigners in history to be allowed inside the inner court of the Qing dynasty. Johnston carried high imperial titles and lived in both the Forbidden City and the New Summer Palace. Johnston met the Ming dynasty imperial descendant, the Marquis of Extended Grace Zhu Yuxun and arranged for him to meet Puyi in the Forbidden City.

More than a tutor, Johnston befriended the isolated adolescent. In his account of his time at the Forbidden City, Johnston notes the rampant corruption of the imperial household, with eunuchs selling off dynastic treasures. He obtained a bicycle and telephone for Pu Yi, and against the wishes of the retainers, much-needed spectacles.

After Puyi was expelled from the Forbidden City in 1924, Johnston served as Secretary to the British China Indemnity Commission (1926). In 1927, he was appointed the second civilian Commissioner at Weihaiwei. He ran the territory until it was returned to the Republic of China on 1 October 1930. Johnston tried to get the British diplomatic legation in Peking to host Puyi, and although the British authorities were not very interested in welcoming the former emperor, the British representative eventually gave Johnston his consent. However, he later discovered that Puyi - in view of the situation and that Johnston was not returning from his efforts - had taken refuge in the Japanese legation after being advised by Zheng Xiaoxu.

After China

Johnston was appointed Professor of Chinese in the University of London in 1931, a post based at the School of Oriental and African Studies, to which he bequeathed his library in 1935. This library, one of the finest collections of Chinese and East Asian books in the country, consists of over 16,000 volumes. 

He retained his ties with Puyi, hosting one of his sisters and her husband at his house in Mortlake road, Kew in London during the 1930s.

Johnston retired in 1937, having acquired the small island of Eilean Rìgh in Loch Craignish, Scotland, Pu Yi granted Sir Reginald Fleming Johnston permission to fly the Imperial flag of Manchukuo on the Island, making it the only location outside of China to do so, and grew and Chinese style garden.  After a short illness, he died in Edinburgh. In his will, he requested that no religious ceremony be conducted. In accordance with his wishes, he was cremated. His ashes were scattered on his island and the surrounding loch.

He never married but was at one stage engaged to the historian Eileen Power, and was close to author Stella Benson. Elizabeth Sparshott, to whom he was engaged at the time leading up to his death, burned many of his letters and other materials, at Johnston's request.

Johnston's book Twilight in the Forbidden City (1934) describes his experiences in Peking and was used as a source for Bernardo Bertolucci's film dramatization of Puyi's life The Last Emperor. He was portrayed by Peter O'Toole in the film.

Published works

References

Further reading
 Shiona Airlie, Reginald Johnston, 2001. 
 Robert Bickers, "Coolie work: Sir Reginald Johnston at the School of Oriental Studies, 1931-1937", Journal of the Royal Asiatic Society, Series III, 5, 3 pp. 385–401.(November, 1995) JSTOR, www.jstor.org/stable/25183064
 Raymond Lamont-Brown, Tutor to the Dragon Emperor: The Life of Sir Reginald Fleming Johnston, 1999. 
 Shiona Airlie, Scottish Mandarin: The Life and Times of Sir Reginald Fleming Johnston,Royal Asiatic Society, 2012.

External links 
 
 

1874 births
1938 deaths
Academics of SOAS University of London
Alumni of Magdalen College, Oxford
Alumni of the University of Edinburgh
British colonial governors and administrators in Asia
British sinologists
British Weihaiwei people
Civil servants from Edinburgh
Commanders of the Order of the British Empire
Diplomats from Edinburgh
Knights Commander of the Order of St Michael and St George
Royal tutors
Scottish colonial officials
Scottish scholars and academics
Scottish schoolteachers